Filadelfia (Spanish for Philadelphia) is a town and municipality in the Colombian Department of Caldas.

References

Municipalities of Caldas Department